Svetlana Kuznetsova defeated Dinara Safina in the final, 6–4, 6–2 to win the women's singles tennis title at the 2009 French Open. It was her second major title, after the 2004 US Open. The final marked the third all-Russian final in major singles history, and the first since the 2004 US Open. This was Safina's third runner-up finish in major finals in as many played. The match was also the conclusion of a series of finals between the pair during that clay court season, as they each claimed the Stuttgart and Rome titles over each other.

Ana Ivanovic was the defending champion, but lost in the fourth round to Victoria Azarenka.

Sorana Cîrstea became the first player born in the 1990s to reach a major quarterfinal.

Seeds

Qualifying

Draw

Finals

Top half

Section 1

Section 2

Section 3

Section 4

Bottom half

Section 5

Section 6

Section 7

Section 8

Championship match statistics

References

External links
Main Draw
2009 French Open – Women's draws and results at the International Tennis Federation

Women's Singles
French Open by year – Women's singles
French Open - Women's Singles
2009 in women's tennis
2009 in French women's sport